Cecil Sydney Frank Smith (16 June 1907 – 1990) was an English footballer who played in the Football League for Brentford and Doncaster Rovers as a left half.

Club career

Brentford 
Smith began his career at non-League club Brentford Market and joined local Football League Third Division South club Brentford in August 1931. He failed to make an appearance during the 1931–32 and 1932–33 seasons, by which time the Bees had been promoted to the Second Division. Smith finally made his debut midway through the 1933–34 season, in a 3–2 defeat to West Ham United on 6 January 1934. He missed the entire 1934–35 season, in which Brentford were promoted to the First Division for the first time in the club's history, though he did win the London Challenge Cup with the reserve team. Smith departed Griffin Park in November 1936, after making just three first team appearances in five years with Brentford.

Doncaster Rovers 
Smith joined Second Division strugglers Doncaster Rovers in November 1936. He made 68 league appearances and scored two goals before leaving at the end of the 1938–39 season.

Honours 
Brentford
 London Challenge Cup: 1934–35

Career statistics

References

1907 births

Footballers from Hounslow
English footballers
Brentford F.C. players
English Football League players
Doncaster Rovers F.C. players
Association football wing halves
1990 deaths